Wareek is a Central Victorian locality which straddles both the Pyrenees Shire and the Shire of Central Goldfields.

People and properties
The "largest landholder and possibly the wealthiest" in the area was Charles Wilson from Sunny Park Wareek ( Coordinates  ).  Wilson's daughter Maude Wilson married John Miller in 1901 at Sunny Park and they then lived in the Rathscar  district where their four children were born. John and his brother Bill were share farmers.

The Norwood Homestead on Norwood Road, Wareek, ( Coordinates  ), constructed in 1863, is said to be "one of the most distinctive gothic revival houses in Victoria". The two-storey homestead is registered on the Register of the National Estate.

At the Wareek Hall there is an Honour Roll, of those from the Bung Bong district, who fought in World War I.  It contains 19 names, including 5 names of those who did not return.

Bung Bong, Wareek Cemetery 

The cemetery is located at 413 Bung Bong-Rathscar Rd, Wareek VIC 3465. ( Coordinates  ) and in 2017 is being upgraded by the community with new fences and facilities.

Information on the interments, with more details and images of the headstones - here.

Wareek Hall

The Wareek Hall was officially opened in August 1914.  The opening ceremony included speeches, a concert and concluded with a "bountiful supper".  The centenary of that opening was "celebrated" in August 2014.

See also
 Bung Bong, Victoria
 Homebush, Victoria
 List of localities in the Shire of Central Goldfields
 List of locations in the Shire of Pyrenees
 Rathscar, Victoria

References

External links
  Avoca and District Historical Society

Towns in Victoria (Australia)